Syncerastis is a genus of moths of the family Yponomeutidae.

Species
Syncerastis ptisanopa - Meyrick, 1931 

Yponomeutidae